San Cristobo is one of four parishes (administrative divisions) in Villanueva de Oscos, a municipality within the province and autonomous community of Asturias, in northern Spain.

Villages and hamlets
 A Bovia
 Busdemouros
 El Busquete
 Moureye
 San Cristobo
 A Sela de Murias

References 

Parishes in Villanueva de Oscos